In Gubbi Gubbi mythology, Dhakhan is an ancestral spirit. He is described as a giant serpent with the tail of a giant fish. He often appears as a rainbow, as this is his way of travelling between the watering holes which are his homes. He is also the creator of the snakes and serpents that live within the waterholes.

See also 

 Rainbow serpent

Australian Aboriginal gods
Snake gods
Rainbow serpent deities